The governor of Bihar is a nominal head and representative of the President of India in the state of Bihar. The Governor is appointed by the President for a term of 5 years.  Rajendra Vishwanath Arlekar is the current governor of Bihar. Former President Zakir Hussain and Ram Nath Kovind were two such Governors of Bihar who succeeded on to become the President of India.

Powers and functions
The Governor has:

Executive powers related to administration, appointments and removals,
Legislative powers related to lawmaking and the state legislature, that is Vidhan Sabha or Vidhan Parishad, and
Discretionary powers to be carried out according to the discretion of the Governor.

In his ex-officio capacity, the Governor of Bihar is Chancellor of the universities of Bihar (at present 12) as per the Acts of the Universities.

Governors of Bihar

See also
Governor (India)
Chief Minister of Bihar
List of Governors of Bihar and Orissa

References

External links
Bihar governor website

 
Bihar
Governors